Tanju Kayhan (born 22 July 1989 in Vienna, Austria) is a retired Austrian footballer.

Club career

On 30 January 2010 left SK Rapid Wien on loan to SC Wiener Neustadt, he will return on 30 June 2010. He signed a two-year deal with Göztepe SK in June 2016.

On 30 August 2018, he has signed 2-year contract with Adana Demirspor. However, due to an anterior cruciate ligament injury a week after his arrival, he never played an official game for the club, before leaving the club in March 2020. In May 2020, Kayhan was also operated for a articular cartilage damage.

Later career
In February 2021, Kayhan returned to Austria when he signed with SV Stripfing. However, he later revealed that he never signed a specific agreement with the club and he never really appeared on the teamlist for the club.

Kayhan later began a career as a personal football coach. Together with is brother, Coskun Kayhan, they founded Football-CTK.

International career
He received his first call-up for Austria in winter 2008–2009 but only made his debut against Italy national under-21 football team on 11 February 2009.

Personal life
Kayhan was born to Turkish parents. He has three brothers who plays football Coskun played for SC Zwettl, Ercan for ASC Götzendorf and Orhan Kayhan for SVR Wolfersberg. He also holds Turkish citizenship.

References

External links

 
 
Rapid stats – Rapid Site
Guardian Football

1989 births
Living people
Footballers from Vienna
Turkish footballers
Austrian footballers
SK Rapid Wien players
SC Wiener Neustadt players
Austrian Football Bundesliga players
Beşiktaş J.K. footballers
Mersin İdman Yurdu footballers
Eskişehirspor footballers
Elazığspor footballers
Kardemir Karabükspor footballers
Göztepe S.K. footballers
Adana Demirspor footballers
Süper Lig players
TFF First League players
Austrian people of Turkish descent
Austria under-21 international footballers
Association football fullbacks